The simple station Puente Aranda, is part of the TransMilenio mass-transit system of Bogotá, Colombia, which opened in the year 2000.

Location

The station is located to the west of downtown Bogotá, specifically on Troncal Calle 13 between Carreras 47 and 49.

History

The station was opened in 2003 after completion of the Calle 13 portion of the Américas line, from De La Sabana to this station.

The station is named Puente Aranda after the industrial locality in which it is located. It is also the common name of a bridge located the west of the station.

Station services

Old trunk services

Main line service

Feeder routes
This station has no feeder routes.

Inter-city service

This station has no connections to inter-city buses.

External links
TransMilenio

See also
Bogotá
TransMilenio
List of TransMilenio Stations

TransMilenio